Matabei is an impact crater on Mercury. It has a set of dark rays. Dark rays are rare on Mercury, but other occurrences have been identified, such as at Mozart crater. Mozart crater is interpreted to have excavated dark material from depth during the impact event, creating dark streamers. The dark rays from Matabei may have a similar origin.

Matabei was named by the IAU in 2009 after Japanese painter Iwasa Matabei.

To the northeast of Matabei is the crater Pigalle.  To the south is Rilke, and to the northwest is Guido d'Arezzo.

References

Impact craters on Mercury